The Davis & Elkins Senators are the athletic teams that represent Davis & Elkins College, located in Elkins, West Virginia, in NCAA Division II intercollegiate sports. The Senators compete as members of the Mountain East Conference (MEC) for all sports except men's lacrosse, which is an affiliate of the Great Midwest Athletic Conference (G-MAC). In 2019, the Senators joined the MEC, thereby reuniting with most of their historic rivals.

The Senators were previously members of the West Virginia Intercollegiate Athletic Conference (WVIAC), joining as a founder in 1924 and remaining as a member until it was disbanded in 2012. Davis & Elkins was then forced to join the G-MAC after the football-playing members of the WVIAC formed the MEC. The Senators remained in the G-MAC until 2019, when the Mountain East added Davis & Elkins to replace Shepherd University.

Varsity teams

List of teams

Men's sports (10)
 Baseball
 Basketball
 Cross Country
 Golf 
 Lacrosse
 Soccer
 Swimming
 Tennis
 Track and field
 Wrestling

Women's sports (12)
 Acrobats and tumbling
 Basketball
 Cross country
 Golf
 Lacrosse
 Soccer
 Softball
 Swimming
 Tennis
 Track and field
 Triathlon
 Volleyball

National championships

Team

References

External links